The 2020 Somali First Division is the 47th season of the Somali First Division, the top-tier football league in Somalia. The season started on 25 December 2019.

Teams

Standings

References

External links
Somali Football Federation

Somalia
Football leagues in Somalia
Football